Chasanow is a surname. Notable people with the surname include:
 Abraham Chasanow (1910–1989), U.S. Navy employee, subject of security investigation
 Deborah K. Chasanow (born 1948), United States federal judge